1st Murzino (1-se Mırźa) is a rural locality (a village) in Ufimsky Selsoviet of Khaybullinsky District, Russia. The population was 222 as of 2010.

Geography 
1st Murzino is located 61 km north of Akyar (the district's administrative centre) by road. Pervomayskoye is the nearest rural locality.

Streets 
 Gareeva
 Gafury
 Zaki Validi
 Pobedy
 S. Yulaeva

References

External links 
 1st Murzino on travellers.ru
 Council of Municipalities of the Republic of Bashkortostan
 Historical background of the village 1st Murzino on urgaza.ru

Rural localities in Khaybullinsky District